Pyrausta sanguinalis, the scarce crimson and gold, is a moth of the family Crambidae. The species was first described by Carl Linnaeus in his 1767 12th edition of Systema Naturae. It is found across western Europe as far east as southern Finland.  In the British Isles it was formerly found at multiple coastal locations in north-west England and Scotland, however it has now much declined and it is restricted to a few locations in Northern Ireland, in the west of Ireland, and a single site on the Isle of Man.

The wingspan is 14–18 mm. The forewings are brownish ochreous, basal and dorsal areas deep yellow, disc yellow mixed; markings purple-crimson; a streak along costa to 3/4; a fascia before middle; an oblong discal spot, connected above with costal streak, and sometimes beneath with preceding fascia; a subterminal fascia. Hindwings in male light grey, darker terminally, in female grey; termen crimson in middle. The larva is greenish-grey, reddish tinged; subdorsal and spiracular lines whitish; head brown.

The moth flies from June to August depending on the location.

The larvae feed on common sage, rosemary and thyme.

References

External links

 https://maps.biodiversityireland.ie/Species/79259, accessed 15 June 2021

sanguinalis
Moths described in 1767
Moths of Europe
Taxa named by Carl Linnaeus